Nir Felder (born Dec 30, 1982) is an American jazz and session guitarist, composer, and music producer. In addition to leading his own band, Felder has performed and recorded with a diverse array of artists across the jazz and popular music genre spectrum, including Diana Krall, Brad Mehldau, John Mayer, Rina Sawayama, Ben Platt, Chaka Khan, Keyon Harrold, Robert Glasper, Chris Dave, PJ Morton, Snarky Puppy, Terrace Martin, Kamasi Washington, Erykah Badu, Common, Anderson .Paak, Dave Chapelle, Dave Matthews Band, Benson Boone, Terri Lyne Carrington, Vijay Iyer, Blood Sweat and Tears, Chuck Mangione, Greg Osby, Jordan Smith, Amy Schumer, Victor Wooten, Shoshana Bean, Jack DeJohnette, Esperanza Spalding, Bobby McFerrin, Meshell Ndegeocello, Dianne Reeves, the New York City Opera, and others.

Early life
Nir Felder was born December 30, 1982 at Columbia Presbyterian Hospital in New York City’s Washington Heights neighborhood. After living between Washington Heights, Harlem, and Manhattan’s Upper West Side, his family moved to the New York City suburbs of Hartsdale, NY in 1987 and Katonah, NY in 1994.  

He attended John Jay High School from 1997-2001 and The Berklee School of Music from 2001 to 2005. While at Berklee he was the recipient of the Billboard Endowed Scholarship, as well as the college’s Jimi Hendrix Award, and Stephen D. Holland Award.

Career

In 2010, Felder was lauded as the “next big jazz guitarist” by NPR. In 2013, Felder signed to Sony Masterworks and released his first solo album “Golden Age” under their Okeh imprint in 2014.

His second album “II” was released by Ropeadope Records in 2020.

Educational 
Felder has been a faculty member at The New School’s College of Performing Arts since 2016 and an associate professor at Berklee College of Music since 2020. 

He has also taught at Italy’s Fondazione Siena Jazz since 2012, at workshops at the Banff Centre and in Langnau, Switzerland and given masterclasses at Arnhem Conservatory, the Cultural Center de Belem, the University of Southern California, Los Angeles College of Music, the University of North Texas, Hunter College, Humber College, the University of Toronto, the University of Wisconsin Parkside, LACHSA and many others.

Film, TV, and Broadway Appearances 
Felder appears in the Netflix special “Live from Radio City Music Hall” accompanying Ben Platt. He has also performed with various musical acts on the Late Show with Stephen Colbert, the Tonight Show Starring Jimmy Fallon, NBC's Christmas in Rockefeller Center, Good Morning America, Late Night with Seth Myers, The Late Late Show with James Corden, The Ellen DeGeneres Show, Jimmy Kimmel Live!, the US Open, as well as in the house bands of the Jimmy Kimmel Live! and Maya and Marty shows.

He has played in the pit orchestras of the Broadway shows “Spider-Man: Turn Off the Dark”, “The Book of Mormon” and “& Juliet”, as well as participating in workshops for upcoming shows.

Discography

As leader
 Golden Age (Okeh, 2014)
 II (Ropeadope, 2020)

As sideman
Francisco Mela, Melao (AYVA Musica, 2006)
Meilana Gillard, Day One (Inner Circle Music, 2008)
Greg Osby, 9 Levels (Inner Circle Music, 2008)
David Weiss, Snuck In (Sunnyside, 2008)
Tim Kuhl, Ghost (Self-Released, 2008)
Rebecca Collins, Chameleon Blues (Mutineer Music, 2008)
Dan Aran, Breathing (Smalls, 2009)
Tim Kuhl, King (Self-Released, 2009)
Sean Nowell, The Seeker (Posi-Tone, 2009)
Makoto Hirahara, Vocalese (Nippon Columbia, 2009)
Sunny Jain, Taboo (Bjurecords, 2010)
Alper Yılmaz, Over The Clouds (Kayique, 2010)
Ken Thomson and Slow/Fast, It Would Be Easier If (Intuition, 2010)
Nell Bryden, What Does It Take? (157 Records, 2010)
Brian Landrus, Capsule (BlueLand, 2011)
Jason Palmer, Here Today (Steeplechase, 2011)
Bobby Selvaggio, Grass Roots Movement (Arabesque Recordings, 2011)
Le Beouf Brothers, In Praise of Shadows (Nineteen-Eight Records, 2011)
Maria Neckam, Unison (Sunnyside, 2012)
Ben Wendel, Frame (Sunnyside, 2012)
José James, No Beginning No End (Blue Note, 2012)
Mark Guiliana, A Form of Truth (Heernt, 2013)
Terri Lyne Carrington, Money Jungle: Provocative in Blue (GrooveJazz, 2013)
Janek Gwizdala, Theatre by the Sea (Self-Released, 2013)
Brian Landrus, Mirage (BlueLand, 2013)
David Weiss, Venture Inward (Posi-Tone, 2013)
Lauren Falls, The Quiet Fight (Self-Released, 2013)
Tony Grey, Elevation (Abstract Logix, 2013)
Stéphane Huchard, Panamerican (Jazz Village, 2013)
Janek Gwizdala, Motion Picture (Self-Released, 2014)
Eric Harland, Vipassana (GSI, 2014)
Jerome Vroelijk's New Morning, New Morning Kong Suite (Self-Released, 2014)
Rudy Royston, 303 (Greenleaf Music, 2014)
Enoch Lee, Finish Line (Self-Released, 2014)
Ken Thomson and Slow/Fast, Settle (NCM East, 2014)
Otis Brown III, The Thought Of You (Blue Note, 2014)
Manuel Valera, Urban Landscape (Destiny, 2015)
Hironori Momoi, Liquid Knots (Apollo Sounds, 2015)
The NYC Improv Project, Melting Point (MFA Records Presents) (MFA, 2015)
Manuel Valera & Groove Square, Urban Landscape (Destiny, 2015)
Marine Futin, Qui Danse (Self-Released, 2015)
Sarah Kervin, Into the City (Self-Released, 2015)
Frank Catalano, Bye Bye Blackbird (Ropeadope, 2016)
Band of Other Brothers, City of Cranes (Ear Up, 2016)
Olivier Le Goas, Reciprocity (Neuklang, 2016)
Sungtaek Oh, Harlem Renaissance (Artbus, 2016)
Jason Miles & Ingrid Jensen, Kind of New (Whaling City Sound, 2016)
Uros Spasojevic Project, Third View (Self-Released, 2016)
The Wee Trio, Wee + 3 (Bionic, 2016)
Lex Sadler's Rhythm and Stealth, Polytronic (Ropeadope, 2016)
Kevin Field, The A List (Warner, 2017)
Keyon Harrold, The Mugician (Sony, 2017)
Scott Kinsey, No Sleep (Kinesthetic Music, 2017)
David Weiss, Wake Up Call (Ropeadope, 2017)
Taylor Haskins, Gnosis (Recombination, 2017)
May Cheung, The Departure (Self-Released, 2017)
Bob Reynolds, Guitar Band (Self-Released, 2017)
Rio Miyachi, November (Self-Released, 2017)
Scott Kinsey Featuring Naina Kundu, No Sleep (Kinesthetic, 2017)
Dick Brewer, It's All About Latin (Self-Released, 2017)
Deva Mahal, Run Deep (Motema Music, 2018)
Sachal Vasandani, Shadow Train (GSI, 2018)
Sylent Running (Barney McAll & Chris Hale & Gian Slater), Empathy Chip (Extra Celestial Arts, 2018)
Matt Penman, Good Question (Sunnyside, 2018)
Alyson Murray, Breathe (Self-Released, 2018)
Charlie Rosen & The 8-Bit Big Band, Press Start! (Self-Released, 2018)
Rémi-Jean Leblanc, Déductions (Bent River, 2018)
Mosa, Who We Are (Self-Released, 2018)
Javier Santiago, Phoenix (Ropeadope, 2018)
Various, A Day In The Life: Impressions Of Pepper (Impulse!, 2018)
Culture Revolution ft. Keyon Harrold, Sylwester Ostrowski, When You Are Here (Wydawnictwo Agora, 2018)
Kevin Hays, Across the Sea (Via Veneto, 2019)
Ben Platt, Sing to Me Instead (Deluxe) (Atlantic, 2019)
Robin McKelle, Alterations (Doxie, 2019)
Ziv Ravitz, No Man Is An Island (Sound Surveyor Music, 2019)
Chase Baird ft. Brad Mehldau, A Life Between (Soundsabound, 2019)
Javier Santiago, B-Sides: The Phoenix Sessions (Ropeadope, 2019)
Brett Williams, S3asons (Self-Released, 2019)
Olivier Le Goas & Reciprocity, On Ramp Of Heaven Dreams (Challenge, 2020)
Kevin Field, Soundtology (Timezone, 2020)
Ernesto Cervini, Tetrahedron (Anzic, 2020)
Yutaka Yamada, Great Pretender Original Soundtrack (Wit Studio, 2020)
Band of Other Brothers, Look Up! (Ear Up, 2021)
Hironori Momoi, Flora and Fauna (Goon Trap, 2021)
Rebecca Angel, Love Life Choices (Timeless Grooves, 2021)
Shedrick Mitchell, What Do You Say? (Self-Released, 2021)
Scott Kinsey & Mer Sal, Adjustments (Blue Canoe, 2021)
Jared Schonig, Two Takes Volume 2: Big Band (Anzic, 2021)
Brian Landrus, Red List (Palmetto, 2022)
Rachel Eckroth, The Garden (Rainy Day, 2022)
Geoff Keezer, Playdate (Markeez Records, 2022)
Creswick fka Liam Budge, Reissues Vol. 1 (Self-Released, 2022)
Alternative Guitar Summit, Honoring Pat Martino, Vol. 1 (HighNote, 2022)
Ray Angry and Timo Elliston, Life & Beth (Original Series Soundtrack) (Lakeshore, 2022)
Loris AL Raimondi, Passing Through Emotions (Fusion Notes, 2022)
Christian Frentzen, Second Encounter (Self-Released, 2023)
Marty Isenberg, The Way I Feel Inside: Inspired by the films of Wes Anderson (Self-Released, 2023)

References

Further reading
 Chinen, Nate. (July 12, 2013). Jazz. The New York Times. 162(56195): 15. 
Garelick, Jon. (January 28, 2014). Nir Felder, 'Golden Age'. The Boston Globe.
Katzif, Michael. (February 4, 2014). Watch Jazz Guitarist Nir Felder Play Live At Rockwood. Soundcheck. WNYC.
 Lockwood, Wayne. (February 4, 2014). Record Store Tuesday: Guitarist Nir Felder forges his own "Golden Age" with debut CD. Daily News. Retrieved February 14, 2014.
Orr, Dacey. (November 21, 2013). Song Premiere: Nir Felder – "Lights". Paste. 
Simon, Travis. Kogan, Josh. (March 5, 2014). Undergrowth Episode 36 – Nir Felder. The Undergrowth.
 

1982 births
American jazz guitarists
Berklee College of Music alumni
People from Katonah, New York
Living people
Okeh Records artists
Jazz musicians from New York (state)
21st-century American guitarists